FC Girondins de Bordeaux won Division 1 season 1949/1950 of the French Association Football League with 51 points.

Participating teams

Bordeaux
RC Lens
Lille OSC
Olympique de Marseille
FC Metz
SO Montpellier
FC Nancy
OGC Nice
RC Paris
Stade de Reims
Stade Rennais UC
CO Roubaix-Tourcoing
AS Saint-Etienne
FC Sète
FC Sochaux-Montbéliard
Stade Français FC
RC Strasbourg
Toulouse FC

Final table

Promoted from Division 2, who will play in Division 1 season 1950/1951
 Nîmes Olympique: Champion of Division 2
 Le Havre AC: Runner-up

Results

Top goalscorers

References
 Division 1 season 1949-1950 at pari-et-gagne.com

Ligue 1 seasons
French
1